M/S J. L. Runeberg (formerly S/S Helsingfors Skärgård) is a steamship built at Sandvikens Skeppsdocka och Mekaniska Verkstad in Helsinki, Finland in 1912. It is named after Johan Ludvig Runeberg, the Finnish national poet. The original steam engine was replaced with a diesel engine in 1962.

The ship operates between Helsinki and Porvoo from May to September four to five days a week, and between Helsinki and Loviisa from July to August once per week.

Statistics
 Passengers: 220
 Length: 28.8 m
 Width: 6.65 m
 Draft: 2.0 m
 ISM certified in 1998

References

External links
 
 Official site

Ships of Finland
Ships built in Helsinki
1912 ships